Albania participated in the 2010 Summer Youth Olympics in Singapore.

The Albanian team consisted of 4 athletes competing in 4 sports: athletics, judo, rowing and swimming.

Athletics

Note: The athletes who do not have a "Q" next to their Qualification Rank advance to a non-medal ranking final.

Boys
Track and road events

Judo

Individual

Team

Rowing

Junior's men

Swimming

Girls'

References

External links
Competitors List: Albania

Nations at the 2010 Summer Youth Olympics
2010 in Albanian sport
Albania at the Youth Olympics